Brock Jackley (born 1947) is an American businessman and politician in the state of Washington. He served in the Washington House of Representatives from 2001 to 2003 as a Democrat. He attended the University of Idaho and lives in Las Vegas, Nevada.

References

1947 births
Living people
Democratic Party members of the Washington House of Representatives
Businesspeople from Washington (state)
People from Kitsap County, Washington